Kazuhiro Tsuga is the current President of Panasonic.

Early life and education 
Tsuga studied at Osaka University and graduated in 1979 with a B.S. in bioengineering.  He immediately joined the workforce, and obtained a M.S. in computer science

from the University of California, Santa Barbara in 1986 through a company sponsorship.

Panasonic 
Tsuga first joined Panasonic, then named Matsushita Electric, in 1979.  With a background in research and development, Tsuga's first executive management position came in 2008.

He was elevated to President of Panasonic on June 27, 2012, taking over for Fumio Ōtsubo.  Otsubo, before being replaced, racked up losses of 750 billion yen.  Mr. Tsuga focused on returning Panasonic to profitability, highlighted by cutting 10% of the workforce in addition to re-prioritizing Panasonic's business strategy.

References

External links 
 Panasonic biography

University of California, Santa Barbara alumni
Living people
Year of birth missing (living people)